Wilbur Lee Jennings (1940 – February 11, 2014), known as The Ditchbank Murderer, was an American serial killer who killed at least six girls and women in Fresno and Sacramento, California between 1981 and 1984. On November 20, 1986, he was sentenced to death, but died in custody before he could be executed.

Trial 
Jennings's trial for four of the then believed only five victims began in 1986. The main evidentiary basis for the prosecution's case were the numerous objects identified by victims' family members, chiefly the baseball bat and pipe with blood stains on them, which, according to investigators, were the likely murder weapons. Aside from that, there were numerous testimonies by Jennings' relatives, friends and acquaintances, in addition to that from the murdered girls' friends as well.

Wilbur himself maintained his innocence throughout the whole process, accusing the prosecutor of putting pressure on witnesses and forcing them to give false testimony.

However, despite his efforts, on November 20, Jennings was found guilty on all charges, and was promptly sentenced to death.

Death 
After his conviction, Jennings was transferred to the death row in San Quentin State Prison, where he spent the subsequent years of his life. In October 2005, following the results of a DNA examination, Jennings was linked to the murder of 76-year-old Clarice Reinke, who had been raped and killed in Fresno in June 1983, as well as that of 17-year-old Debra Chandler, who had been raped and murdered in July 1981. Chandler's body, like with Jennings' other victims, had been found in an irrigation ditch outside Fresno. In the Reinke case, authorities found a peculiarity: aside from Wilbur's biological traces, they also found DNA belonging to another man. After further inquiries, it was linked to 64-year-old Alvin Johnson, who was serving a prison sentence for a rape-murder committed in Utah. New charges were brought against Jennings, but he refused to admit his guilt in either of the cases, claiming that the results had been falsified. By that time, he was having health problems, as he had been diagnosed with prostate cancer and diabetes, as a result of which his trial for the murders of Reinke and Chandler was postponed several times.

Ultimately, the criminal case for Chandler began in late 2013, leading Wilbur Jennings to be transferred out of San Quentin State Prison to the Sacramento County Jail, where he died on February 11, 2014, aged 73, due to complications from his diseases.

See also
 Alvin Johnson
 List of serial killers in the United States

References

External links
 People v. Jennings (1991 Appeal)
 People v. Jennings (1991)
 Supreme Court v. Jennings

1940 births
2014 deaths
20th-century American criminals
American people convicted of assault
American people convicted of murder
American people convicted of rape
American rapists
American serial killers
Criminals from California
Deaths from diabetes
Deaths from prostate cancer
Male serial killers
People convicted of murder by California
People from Shreveport, Louisiana
Prisoners sentenced to death by California
Serial killers who died in prison custody